London Caledonians F.C. was an amateur football club based in London, primarily for Scottish players. They were founder members of the Isthmian League, which they won in its inaugural season. They remained in the league until 1939 when the club folded.

Foundation

In 1885, Hugh Macpherson, a player with Champion Hill F.C., a London club with a number of Scots members, founded the club, because of the "scant success" of United London Scottish, the first London club aimed solely at exiled Scots. Macpherson brought together more Scots players for the new club, including some of the U.L.S. players such as Bill Stirling (a forward converted into a goalkeeper) and captain W.E. Fry, with the result that U.L.S. was both no longer needed and no longer competitive.  In the 1886-87 London Senior Cup, U.L.S. went down 7–1 at St Martin's Athletic of Priory Farm in the first round, whereas London Caledonians reached the quarter-finals. By 1888, U.L.S. was defunct and London Caledonians became the only "exile" club in the capital.

History

The club won the first of their five Middlesex Senior Cups in 1889–90 and the first of their five London Senior Cups in 1899–1900. They were founder members of the Isthmian League in 1905 and were champions in its first season. They won the league again in 1907–08 and then three times in a row between 1911–12 and 1913–14.

The club's best run in the FA Cup came in 1886–87, reaching the third round, where they were drawn with the Old Carthusians.  The game was scheduled for the Princess Victoria ground in Shepherd's Bush, but, as a heavy frost had fallen, the club sent a telegram to P.M. Walters of the Carthusians, saying that it would not turn up. The Carthusians nevertheless did attend, and the tie was awarded to them.

After qualifying rounds were brought in two years later, the club reached the first round of the FA Cup in 1912–13, but lost 3–1 at Wolverhampton Wanderers. The following season they started in the first round, but lost 3–0 at Huddersfield Town.

In 1922–23 the club reached the final of the FA Amateur Cup, in which they defeated Evesham Town 2–1. The following season they reached the semi-finals again, but lost in a second replay. A sixth Isthmian League title was won in 1924–25. The following season they again entered the FA Cup in the first round, but lost to Ilford. In 1926–27 they again lost in the first round, this time to Luton Town. However, the following season they reached the third round, where they lost 3–2 at home to Crewe Alexandra. The club did not return to the league after World War II.

Honours
FA Amateur Cup
Winners 1922–23
Isthmian League
Champions 1905–06, 1907–08, 1911–12, 1912–13, 1913–14, 1924–25
London Senior Cup
Winners 1899–1900, 1907–08, 1914–15, 1922–26, 1927–28
Middlesex Senior Cup
Winners 1889–90, 1890–91, 1898–99, 1899–1900, 1934–35

See also
London Caledonians F.C. players

References

Defunct football clubs in England
Association football clubs disestablished in 1939
Defunct football clubs in London
Isthmian League
1939 disestablishments in England
Association football clubs established in 1886
Diaspora sports clubs in the United Kingdom
Diaspora association football clubs in England
Scottish diaspora in Europe